Adhemar is both a given name and a surname. Notable people with the name include:

Given name
 Adhemar of Salerno (died 861), prince
 Adhemar of Capua (died after 1000), prince
 Adhémar de Chabannes (988-1034), French monk and historian
 Adhemar of Le Puy (died 1098), bishop
 Adhémar Jori/Jory (1375), lord of Domeyrat près Carlat,
 François Adhémar de Monteil (1603–1689), Archbishop of Arles
 François Adhémar de Monteil, Comte de Grignan (1632–1714), French aristocrat
 Adhémar Jean Claude Barré de Saint-Venant (1797-1886), mechanician
 Louis-Alfred-Adhémar Rivet (1873-1951), politician
 Adhémar Raynault (1891-1984), politician
 Adhemar (footballer, born 1896), Adhemar dos Santos, Brazilian football midfielder
 Adhemar Pimenta (1896-1970), sports manager
 Adhemar de Chaunac (born 1896, fl. 1961), vintner
 Adhemar de Barros (1901-1969), mayor of São Paulo and Governor of São Paulo
 Adhemar da Silva (1927-2001), athlete
 Adhemar Bultheel (born 1948), Belgian mathematician
 Adhemar (footballer, born 1972), Adhemar Ferreira de Camargo Neto, Brazilian football forward

Surname
 Joseph Adhemar (died 1862), mathematician

Fictional characters
 Adhemar, Flemish comic book character in The Adventures of Nero by Marc Sleen.
Count Adhemar, the main antagonist of A Knight's Tale, a medieval comedy starring Heath Ledger.

See also 
 Bronzen Adhemar
 Château des Adhémar
 La Garde-Adhémar
 Grignan-Les Adhemar AOC
 Rodovia Adhemar de Barros

References 

Brazilian given names
French masculine given names